Herbaspirillum hiltneri is a Gram-negative bacterium of the genus Herbaspirillum isolated from surface-sterilized wheat roots. It was collected in the Oberpfalz in Germany.

References

External links
Type strain of Herbaspirillum hiltneri at BacDive -  the Bacterial Diversity Metadatabase

Burkholderiales
Bacteria described in 2006